Helen Percy, Duchess of Northumberland,  ( Lady Helen Magdalan Gordon-Lennox; 13 December 1886 – 13 June 1965) was an English aristocrat and courtier.

Early life
She was the second daughter of Charles Gordon-Lennox, Earl of March and Kinrara (later the 7th Duke of Richmond), and his second wife, Isabel Sophie Craven, herself the second daughter of William George Craven (a grandson of William Craven, 1st Earl of Craven) and Lady Mary Yorke (second daughter of Charles Yorke, 4th Earl of Hardwicke). From her father's first marriage to Amy Mary Ricardo, she had three half-brothers and two half-sisters, including Charles Gordon-Lennox, 8th Duke of Richmond, Lady Evelyn Gordon-Lennox (wife of Sir John Cotterell, 4th Baronet), Lady Violet Gordon-Lennox (wife of Henry Brassey, 1st Baron Brassey, of Apethorpe), Lord Esmé Charles Gordon-Lennox, and Lord Bernard Charles Gordon-Lennox.

Career
She was Mistress of the Robes to Queen Elizabeth The Queen Mother, from 1937 to 1964 and was appointed a Dame Grand Cross of the Royal Victorian Order in 1938. She received the Queen Elizabeth II Version of the Royal Household Long and Faithful Service Medal in 1957 for 20 years service to the Royal Family.

Personal life
She was married on 18 October 1911 to Earl Percy, who succeeded his father as 8th Duke of Northumberland in 1918, whereupon she became known as the Duchess of Northumberland. The couple had six children:

 Henry George Alan Percy, 9th Duke of Northumberland (1912–1940), who was killed in action on 21 May 1940.
 Hugh Algernon Percy, 10th Duke of Northumberland (1914–1988).
 Lady Elizabeth Ivy Percy (1916–2008), who married Douglas Douglas-Hamilton, 14th Duke of Hamilton, in 1937.
 Lady Diana Evelyn Percy (1917–1978), who married John Egerton, 6th Duke of Sutherland, in 1939 in Westminster Abbey.
 Lord Richard Charles Percy (1921–1989), who married Sarah Jane Elizabeth Norton, daughter of Petre Norton, in 1966. After her death, he married Hon. Clayre Campbell, daughter of Alastair Campbell, 4th Baron Stratheden and Campbell, in 1979.
 Lord Geoffrey William Percy (1925–1984), who married Mary Elizabeth Lea, daughter of Ralph Lea, in 1955.

Lady Northumberland died on 13 June 1965.

References

1886 births
1965 deaths
Helen
Dames Grand Cross of the Royal Victorian Order
Daughters of British dukes
Mistresses of the Robes to Queen Elizabeth The Queen Mother
Place of birth missing
Place of death missing
Burials at Westminster Abbey